Louise Isabelle Alexandrine Augusta, Countess of Sayn-Hachenburg, Burgravine of Kirchberg, full German name: Luise Isabelle Alexandrine Auguste, Gräfin zu Sayn-Hachenburg, Burggräfin von Kirchberg (19 April 1772, Hachenburg – 6 January 1827, Vienna, Austrian Empire) was the Princess consort of Nassau-Weilburg (28 November 1788 – 9 January 1816) through her marriage to Frederick William, Prince of Nassau-Weilburg.

Early life
Countess Louise Isabelle was born as the only child of Burggraf Georg Wilhelm von Kirchberg, Count of Sayn-Hachenburg (1751-1777) and his wife, Princess Isabelle Auguste Reuss of Greiz (1752-1824).

Marriage and family
As she was the only heir to her father Louise married Frederick William, Hereditary Prince of Nassau-Weilburg, son of Charles Christian, Prince of Nassau-Weilburg and his wife Princess Carolina of Orange-Nassau, on 31 July 1788 in Hachenburg. Frederick William succeeded to his father Charles Christian upon his death on 28 November 1788. They had four children:

 William, Duke of Nassau (14 June 1792 - 20 August/30 August 1839)
 Auguste Luise Wilhelmine of Nassau-Weilburg (Weilburg, 5 January 1794 - Weilburg, 11 April 1796)
 Henriette Alexandrine Friederike Wilhelmine (30 October 1797 – 29 December 1829). Married Archduke Charles, Duke of Teschen
 Friedrich Wilhelm of Nassau-Weilburg, then of Nassau (Bayreuth, 15 December 1799 - Vienna, 6 January 1845). He married on 7 June 1840 Anna Ritter, Edle von Vallyemare (Vienna, 21 June 1802 - Paris, 17 June 1864), daughter of Joseph Edler von Vallyemare (1772-1832), widow of Johann Baptist Brunold, created Gräfin von Tiefenbach in 1840. They had issue:
 Wilhelmine Brunold (Atzgersdorf, 5 July 1834 - Geneva, 12 December 1892), created in 1844 Gräfin von Tiefenbach, married in Paris on 30 October 1856 and divorced in 1872 Emile Delamothe de Girardin (- Paris, 27 April 1881)
 Isabelle, Gräfin von Tiefenbach (1841-1842)

Ancestry

References

1772 births
1827 deaths
People from Westerwaldkreis
House of Nassau-Weilburg
Princesses of Nassau-Weilburg
Burials in the Royal Crypt of Weilburg Schlosskirche
Royal reburials